Hilde Hefte (born 1 September 1956 in Kristiansand, Norway) is a Norwegian jazz singer.

Biography 
Hefte got much of her musical education from the well reputated Barratt Due Institute of Music in Oslo, Norway with piano as primary and vocals as secondary instruments. She played saxophone and clarinet for ten years when she was young, as an apprentice to her father who was saxophone teacher and musician. She was also trained as an actor, first with Alex Scherpf and later joining a Theater school. She also received an increasing number of roles at Agder Teater and at various other venues, including in plays like Fugleelskerne by Jens Bjørneboe, and Piaf by Pan Gam. During a period of some years she was also teaching music at Agder musikkonservatorium before she started as a full-time musician.

Her debut solo album Round Chet's Midnight was released in 1999, and received great reviews, like Down Beat Magazine: "She's making waves on the Norwegian scene."

There after Hefte has released five more albums under her own name, receiving excellent reviews in the press.
She has written lyrics and composed music to both her own albums and a lot of other artists. 
Hilde has been given various leading roles at the theatre, among others; the main role as Edith Piaf at Agder Theatre. She has also been hired to write and arrange music for various locale theatre productions.
Jazz musician - recordings: 'Round Chet's Midnight (1999), Playsong – The Music of Bill Evans (2001) Hildes BossaHefte (2003), her onely Norwegian album, On The Corner (2006), An Evening in Prague (2007), recorded in Prague, with Prague Philharmonic Orchestra. In 2013 she released the album Short Stories, and in 2017 the album Quiet Dreams.

Hilde founded and runs Norsk Jazzforlag (2003) and the record label Ponca Jazz Records (2004).

Honors 
2016
THE KRISTIANSAND MUNICIPALITY CULTURE AWARD
2015: Southern Norwegian jazz center award

Discography

Solo albums 
 1999: Round Chet's Midnight (Hot Club)
 2001: Playsong – The Music of Bill Evans (Hot Club)
 2003: Hildes bossaHefte (Hot Club )
 2006: On The Corner (Ponca Jazz)
 2007: An Evening in Prague (Ponca Jazz)
 2013: Short Stories (Ponca Jazz)
 2014: Memory Suite (Ponca Jazz), Japan release
 2017: Quiet Dreams (Ponca Jazz)

Collaborations 
 1997: Kråka Knas 
 2000: Violin (Ola Kvernberg)
 2002: Spor.sorland
 2002: Nice But Easy (Kultur & Spetakkel), with Paul Weeden
 2003: The Next Step (Hot Club), with Jon Larsen
 2006: Jazz Collection 1 (Ponca Jazz), with various artists
 2008: Vi Aner Deg
 2009: Fight Apathy
 2009: A Portrait of Jon Larsen (Hot Club) 
 2011: Bossa Nova Around the World (Putamayo)

References

External links 

 
Ponca Jazz Records Website 
Norsk Jazzforlags Website 

Norwegian women jazz singers
Barratt Due Institute of Music alumni
University of Oslo alumni
Hot Club Records artists
Ponca Jazz Records artists
Musicians from Kristiansand
1956 births
Living people
20th-century Norwegian women singers
20th-century Norwegian singers
21st-century Norwegian women singers
21st-century Norwegian singers